William Pepperell Montague (11 November 1873 – 1 August 1953) was a philosopher of the New Realist school. Montague stressed the difference between his philosophical peers as adherents of either "objective" and "critical realism".

Montague was born in Chelsea, Massachusetts. He earned his bachelors, masters, and doctorate from Harvard University.  He was professor of philosophy at UC Berkeley between 1899 and 1903, and at Columbia University from 1903 to 1947. He was president of the American Philosophical Association's eastern division in the years 1923–1924. He died in New York City.

Works
"PROFESSOR ROYCE'S REFUTATION OF REALISM", Philosophical Review 11 (1902): 43–55.
Holt, Edwin B; Marvin, Walter T; Montague, William P; Perry, Ralph B; Pitkin, Walter B; Spaulding, Edward G. The New Realism: Cooperative Studies in Philosophy, (1912)
The Ways of Knowing or the Methods of Philosophy (1925)
Belief Unbound, a Promethean Religion for the Modern World (1930)
WP Montague and GP Adams, eds. Contemporary American Philosophy: Personal Statements (1930). Two Volumes. Vol II
The Chances of Surviving Death (1934) 
The Ways of Things: A Philosophy of Knowledge, Nature and Value (1940)
Great Visions of Philosophy (1950)

See also

American philosophy
Kratocracy
List of American philosophers

References

20th-century American philosophers
Columbia University faculty
Writers from Chelsea, Massachusetts
1873 births
1953 deaths
Harvard College alumni
University of California, Berkeley faculty